Spy Story is a 1976 British espionage film directed by Lindsay Shonteff and starring Michael Petrovitch, Philip Latham and Don Fellows. It is based on the 1974 novel Spy Story by Len Deighton.

Cast
 Michael Petrovitch ...  Patrick Armstrong 
 Philip Latham ...  Ferdy Foxwell 
 Don Fellows ...  Colonel Schlegel 
 Michael Gwynn ...  Dawlish 
 Nicholas Parsons ...  Ben Toliver 
 Toby Robins ...  Helen Schlegel 
 Tessa Wyatt ...  Sara Shaw 
 Derren Nesbitt ...  Colonel Stok 
 Nigel Plaskitt ...  Mason 
 Ciaran Madden ...  Marjorie 
 Bernard Kay ...  Commander Wheeler 
 Paul Maxwell ...  Submarine Captain 
 Andrew Downie ...  MacGregor 
 John Forgeham ...  Security Guard
 Michael Knowles ... Milkman

References

External links

1976 films
British spy films
Films directed by Lindsay Shonteff
Films based on British novels
1970s spy films
1970s English-language films
1970s British films